Louis Chatelain (23 February 1883 – 6 October 1950) was a 20th-century French historian, archaeologist and university professor. The son of Émile Chatelain, philologist and Latinist, he particularly worked on the excavation sites of Orange, Maktar (Tunisia) and Volubilis (Morocco).

Education 
 A student of the École pratique des hautes études in the historical and philological sciences department, he defended a thesis entitled Les monuments romains d'Orange in 1908.
 A member of the École française de Rome (1908–1911), his memoir then was devoted to the Makthar site.

Works 
Besides his work on Orange and Makthar, most of its activity focused on Morocco's classical archeology in general and in particular Volubilis.

During World War II, after being wounded, he was assigned to Volubilis where he had the site cleared by German prisoners of war and French soldiers.

In 1918, he was appointed director of the department of antiquities of Morocco. He played a role in the creation of the Rabat Archaeological Museum in 1928. A teacher in Morocco until 1941, he was later appointed to Rennes. In 1943, he supported a thesis entitled Le Maroc des Romains.

Publications (selection) 
In addition to numerous articles:
1908: Les monuments romains d'Orange
1916: Les Fouilles de Volubilis (Ksar-Faraoun, Maroc)
1923: Inscriptions latines d'Afrique (Tripolitaine, Tunisie, Maroc), with René Cagnat and Alfred Merlin
1942: Inscriptions latines du Maroc
1944: Le Maroc des Romains: étude sur les centres antiques de la Maurétanie occidentale
1949: Le Maroc des Romains: Album d'illustrations

Bibliography 
 Véronique Brouquier-Reddé, Institut national des sciences de l'archéologie et du patrimoine (Maroc) and René Rebuffat: Louis Chatelain (1883-1950): biographie et bibliographie. Institut national des sciences de l'archéologie et du patrimoine, 2004.

External links 
 Louis Chatelain on data.bnf.fr
 Fiche sur le site de l'académie des sciences d'outremer
 La Préhistoire au Musée Louis Chatelain à Rabat (Maroc) on Persée
 Le Maroc des Romains, étude sur les centres antiques de la Maurétanie occidentale by Louis Chatelain on Persée

1883 births
Scientists from Paris
1950 deaths
École pratique des hautes études alumni
20th-century French historians
French archaeologists
French epigraphers
20th-century archaeologists